The common macrotona (Macrotona australis) is found in southern and eastern Australia.

Taxes
Macrotona australis was first described by Francis Walker in 1870. Synonyms include Eumacrotona bella, Eumacrotona simplex, Heteracris australis, Macrotona gracilis, Macrotona lineola.

Description
Colour varies from red to grey. Most individuals have a bronze colouring behind the rear legs.

Distribution and habitat
Its presence has been verified across mainland Australia and Tasmania.

It is commonly found with spinifex grass in heath habitats.

References

Acrididae